Jagan Prasad Garg was an Indian politician and member of the 13th, 14th, 15th and the 16th Legislative assemblies of Uttar Pradesh. Garg was a member of the Bharatiya Janata Party and represented Agra North constituency of Uttar Pradesh during the Sixteenth Legislative Assembly of Uttar Pradesh.

Early life and education
Jagan Prasad Garg was born in the village Sarhendi in Agra, India in 1952. Garg completed Bachelor's degree from Agra College. Prior to entering politics, he was a businessperson by profession.

Political career
Jagan Prasad Garg has been a MLA for four straight terms (since 1998). He was elected during the by-elections in 1998 for his first term (constituency not known). In his second and third terms, he contested from Agra East (Assembly constituency) (ceased to exist after "Delimitation of Parliamentary and Assembly Constituencies Order, 2008"). He later represented Agra North (Assembly constituency) and was a member of the Bharatiya Janata Party.

On 26 October 2017, Garg caused controversy after he told reporters that he believed the Taj Mahal was built after demolishing a Shiva temple.

Posts held

See also

 Agra North
 Uttar Pradesh Legislative Assembly
 16th Legislative Assembly of Uttar Pradesh
 Politics of India
 Bharatiya Janata Party

References

People from Agra
1952 births
Bharatiya Janata Party politicians from Uttar Pradesh
Living people
Uttar Pradesh MLAs 2002–2007
Uttar Pradesh MLAs 2012–2017
Uttar Pradesh MLAs 2017–2022
Politicians from Agra